GPSS is the General Purpose Simulation System, a programming language.

GPSS may also refer to:

 CLH Pipeline System, formerly the Government Pipelines and Storage System, UK pipeline system
 Guam Public School System, school district
 GPS Software, GPS navigation software